Hayley Scamurra (born December 14, 1994) is a women's ice hockey player who currently plays with the Buffalo Beauts of the  NWHL. Before joining the Beauts, she was a standout for the Northeastern University Huskies, where she played for four seasons.

She is the daughter of former Washington Capitals player Peter Scamurra.  Before playing college hockey, she was one of only a few American players to compete in the Ontario Junior women's league, playing for the Oakville Jr. Hornets and Burlington Jr. Barracudas.

Playing career

College hockey
Scamurra played four seasons as a forward for the Northeastern Huskies, where she played in 123 games and scored 111 points, tied for 21st all-time in school history. She was often paired with Kazmaier Award winner Kendall Coyne as a linemate.

In her freshman season (2013–14), she was chosen as a Hockey East Pro Ambitions All-Rookie Forward, as well as the Rookie of the Month for February 2014.

In her sophomore season (2014–2015), she was third on the team in goals, despite playing in only 19 contests.

Her junior season (2015–16) was her breakout year, as she amassed 43 points and had a plus/minus rating of +43.  She was a key teammate of Coyne, assisting on her 50th goal of the year.

In her final season (2016–17), Scamurra scored 8 goals and an impressive 23 assists, despite losing Kendall Coyne as a linemate.  She was named the WHEA Best Defensive Forward.

Professional hockey
In the 2016 NWHL Draft, Scamurra was chosen by the Buffalo Beauts as the 10th overall pick and the third chosen by Buffalo. She signed with the Beauts on March 10, 2017, to help with the end of season push for the Isobel Cup and was able to appear in the final regular season game, against the Connecticut Whale.  She scored a goal in the first period of that game.

In her first appearance at the Isobel Cup playoffs, Scamurra scored 4 points (1 G, 3 A) in two games, including an assist in the championship game.  The Buffalo Beauts defeated the Boston Pride and won the Isobel Cup as 2016-17 NWHL champions.

During the 2017–18 NWHL season, Scamurra led the Beauts in goals and tied for the team lead in points. She was named Rookie of the Year and was voted one of the three stars of the season by the fans. She was named to the all-star game, where she scored a hat-trick and was named co-MVP. The Beauts lost in the NWHL Championship to the Metropolitan Riveters.

In the 2018–19 NWHL season, Scamurra led the league in scoring with 20 points (10 G, 10 A). She was named to her second all-star game. The Beauts again reached the NWHL finals, achieving this feat for the third consecutive season, before ultimately losing in overtime to the Minnesota Whitecaps.

International hockey 
On January 25, 2019, Scamurra was named to the U.S. Women's National Team Roster for the 2019 Rivalry Series against Team Canada February 12–17, 2019 in London and Toronto, Ontario, and Detroit.

On January 2, 2022, Scamurra was named to Team USA's roster to represent the United States at the 2022 Winter Olympics.

Career statistics

NCAA – Northeastern

.

NWHL – Buffalo Beauts

International – USA

Awards and honors
NWHL Players' Association Top Player of the Year Award (2018–19)
NWHL Leading Scorer Award (2018–19)
(2x) NWHL All-Star (2018, 2019)
Co-MVP, 3rd NWHL All-Star Game
NWHL Co-Player of the Week, Awarded February 5, 2018
NWHL Rookie of the Year
WHEA Best Defensive Forward
WHEA All-Rookie Team
WHEA Rookie of the Month in February 2014

References

External links

1994 births
Living people
American expatriate ice hockey players in Canada
American women's ice hockey forwards
Buffalo Beauts players
Burlington Barracudas players
Ice hockey players from New York (state)
Northeastern Huskies women's ice hockey players
People from Williamsville, New York
Professional Women's Hockey Players Association players
Ice hockey players at the 2022 Winter Olympics
Olympic ice hockey players of the United States
Medalists at the 2022 Winter Olympics
Olympic silver medalists for the United States in ice hockey